Pascal Pellowski (born 18 December 1988) is a German footballer who most recently played for Astoria Walldorf.

Career

Statistics

References

External links

1988 births
Living people
German footballers
3. Liga players
Regionalliga players
SV Darmstadt 98 players
VfL Bochum players
VfL Bochum II players
SV Elversberg players
1. FC Saarbrücken players
FC Astoria Walldorf players
Association football defenders
Sportspeople from Darmstadt
21st-century German people